Simon Arora (born November 1969) is a British billionaire businessman, and former CEO of the retail chain B&M.

Early life
Simon Arora was born in November 1969. He studied law at Cambridge University.

Career
Arora worked as an analyst for McKinsey, 3i and Barclays.

In 1995, he went into business with his younger brother Bobby Arora, importing homewares from Asia and supplying them to UK retail chains, before buying B&M in 2004, which was then a struggling grocery chain based in Blackpool.

In 2017, Simon and Bobby Arora cashed in £215m of shares and reduced their stake in B&M by a quarter, three years after taking it public.

As of May 2019, the Arora brothers (Simon, Bobby and Robin) jointly have a net worth of £2.26 billion.

Arora stepped down as CEO of B&M in September 2022 following 17 years in the role. He remains an executive director at the company.

Personal life
He is married to Shalni Arora, who has a Natural Sciences degree from Cambridge University, and was a co-founder of bio-tech business DxS. They have two daughters.

Arora owns three of the flats at 3–10 Grosvenor Crescent, a Grade II* listed terrace in London's Belgravia district, where he unsuccessfully opposed a legal dispute about concierge services in 2017.

References

1969 births
Living people
British businesspeople
British billionaires
Alumni of Fitzwilliam College, Cambridge